Walsh-Kaiser Co., Inc. was a shipyard in both Cranston and Providence, Rhode Island. It was built during World War II and financed by the Maritime Commission as part of the country's Emergency Shipbuilding Program. It was originally operated by Rheem Manufacturing, a company with no previous shipbuilding expertise. When Rheem had difficulty managing the yard, Kaiser Shipyards was retained to manage the operation.

History

Early history and war years
In 1942, the Maritime Commission selected Fields Point for the location of an emergency shipyard. It was planned to be able to build ships on six different ways. The construction of the shipyard was financed as part of the country's Emergency Shipbuilding Program. Storekeepers and housewives, clerks and youths fresh out of school worked side by side, turning out ship after ship. Construction began on March 28, 1942. The shipyard construction swallowed the popular Kerwin's Beach, which drew thousands to the shores of the Providence River before it was covered over. One million yards of fill from a nearby hillside was dumped onto the mud flats, but this still failed to stabilize the area. The total cost of the shipyard was twenty six million dollars.

On New Year's Eve, 1942, the first of many misfortunes hit the plant. The plate shop, the first step in the production process, burned to the ground. In February 1943, after the Rheem company showed difficulty managing the yard, Kaiser Shipyards was asked to manage the operation of the yard. As a result of the takeover, the size of the yard increased from 9,000 employees to over 14,000 just four months later. Eventually, seven miles of road wound about the yard.

The first ships that the yard produced were Liberty ships. After ten ships were completed, 21 frigates were built. After those ships were finished, 32 attack cargo ships (Navy hull designation AKA) were constructed and launched. In the three years that the yard was in operation, 63 ships were eventually launched and completed.

After learning from their initial mistakes, workers became more skilled with the building of ships. It took only 136 days from the keel laying to delivery of the attack cargo ships. The fastest turnover took a mere 82 days. 

The yard didn't escape recognition by famous dignitaries. President Harry S Truman was escorted by then Governor J. Howard McGrath when Truman toured the yard. Navy Secretary James Forrestal on September 1, 1945 wrote to T.J. Walsh, the head of the company, praising the work of the local yard and saying that it was preeminent in building the great arsenal that helped save the world.

Work was described as decent by the workers who labored there. Wages were also high due to the influence that the AFL had in the area. Common laborers at the yard earned eighty-five cents an hour.

The steady employment actually helped the local economy as the yard employed 18,767 on September 30, 1944. Three months later the payroll included 20,879. During the yard's peak in January 1945, 21,264 people were employed. Among these numbers were over 3,000 women. At the end of the war, the shipyard closed after laying off over 3,000 people in three months.

The shipyard today
Today, the yard has been reused by a few companies. Johnson & Wales University has taken over the northwestern portion of the yard for their culinary arts program. A drive-in theater also operated on the site of the yard from 1958 to 1976. The theater had a 1,700 car capacity.  In the late 1970s there were also plans to construct a cargo container port at the site, but these plans fell through and two cranes from these plans are all that remain.  There is a combined Navy, Marine Corps and Army Reserve center on the site.

Ships built

Liberty Ships

Colony-class frigates

 HMS Anguilla (K500)
 
 HMS Ascension (K502)
 HMS Bahamas (K503)

Artemis-class attack cargo ships

  
 USS Athene (AKA-22) 
 USS Aurelia (AKA-23) 
 USS Birgit (AKA-24) 
  
  
  
  
  
 
  
  
  
 USS Pamina (AKA-34)
  
 USS Renate (AKA-36)
  
  
 
 
 
  
  
  
  
  
 
  
 USS Vanadis (AKA-49)

References

External links 
List of ships built by Walsh-Kaiser Company, Inc.
History of Walsh-Kaiser

United States Navy shipyards
Defunct shipbuilding companies of the United States
United States home front during World War II
Companies based in Providence, Rhode Island
Defunct manufacturing companies based in Rhode Island
Cranston, Rhode Island
Military installations in Rhode Island
1942 establishments in Rhode Island